Randonneurs USA or RUSA is affiliated to Audax Club Parisien and coordinates and promotes the randonneuring style of cycling within the US. Many cycling events, or brevets, which are organized by local RUSA clubs in the United States are sanctioned by the Audax Club Parisien and therefore can be used to qualify for Paris–Brest–Paris and other long brevets around the world.

History
RUSA was formed in 1998 by Jennifer Wise, Johnny Bertrand and John Wagner, along with six others. 

Members from the first year (as of October 1998)

RUSA Specific Events
In addition to the support for ACP events, RUSA offers several other events including RUSA-ONLY brevets.  A very popular RUSA only event is the Permanent.  

The Permanent is a members-only event where previously a member would contact an individual Permanent Owner to sign up to do the Permanent and then eventually ride the Permanent. By the beginning of 2021, for insurance purposes RUSA became the owner of Permanent routes, and members now register online to ride a route (immediately after registration, if desired).  The Permanent can be used to help complete other RUSA ONLY awards such as the R-12 or RUSA Distance Awards. 

A great way for a rider to get introduced to Randonneuring is by riding a Populaire, which is a shorter distance Brevet - 100-199 km in length. By doing so, newcomers get to know and learn about long distance rides style and rules of Randonneuring.

Major brevets
The longest brevets organised by RUSA include:
Cascade 1200 (Seattle International Randonneurs)
Colorado High Country 1200 (Rocky Mountain Cycling Club)
Cracker Swamp 1200 (Central Florida Randonneurs)
Endless Mountains 1240K Randonnée (PA Randonneurs)
Florida Sunshine 1200k (Central Florida Randonneurs)
Gold Rush Randonnée (Davis Bike Club)
Last Chance 1200k Randonnée (Rocky Mountain Cycling Club)
Taste of Carolina (Bicycle for Life)
Texas Rando Stampede (Lone Star Randonneurs)

External links
RUSA
Audax Club Parisien

Cycling organizations in the United States